The Ricky Gervais Show is a cartoon series produced for and broadcast by HBO. The series is an animated version of the popular British audio podcasts and audiobooks of the same name, which feature Ricky Gervais and Stephen Merchant (creators of The Office and Extras), along with colleague and friend Karl Pilkington, talking about various subjects behind the microphone. The TV show consists of past audio recordings of these unscripted "pointless conversations," with animation drawn in a style similar to classic era Hanna-Barbera cartoons, presenting jokes and situations in a literal context. The animated Ricky Gervais Show has aired three 13-episode seasons since it premiered in the United States on February 19, 2010. The second season started on January 14, 2011, and a third season began airing in April 2012.

There were some plans for a possible fourth season as well, which would have used newly recorded audio, but this was shelved. On June 16, 2012, Ricky Gervais announced that the show will not get a fourth season in the foreseeable future. "My worry is that as we've used up all the best material we'd have to record hours and hours of new stuff and it might ruin the naivety of the whole thing. Never say never though, like The Office. But certainly for now", explained Gervais.

The first season was released on region 2 DVD on July 19, 2010. The region 1 (North American) DVD was released on January 4, 2011.

Series overview

Episodes

Season 1 (2010)
Note: All episodes in this season were directed by Craig Kellman.

Season 2 (2011)
Note: From episode 14 until the end of the series, all episodes were directed by Dan Fraga.

Season 3 (2012)

See also
The Ricky Gervais Show (animated series) – the animated TV show
The Ricky Gervais Show – the podcast and audio book series that the TV show is based on
List of The Ricky Gervais Show episodes – list of podcasts and audio books

References

External links

Episode guide

Ricky Gervais Show
Ricky Gervais Show
Ricky Gervais